The 1984–85 Wichita State Shockers men's basketball team represented Wichita State University in the 1984–85 NCAA Division I men's basketball season. They played their home games at the Levitt Arena. They were in their 40th season as a member of the Missouri Valley Conference and 79th season overall. They were led by head coach Gene Smithson in his 7th season at the school. They finished the season 18–13, 11–5 in Missouri Valley play to finish in second place. They won the MVC tournament to receive an automatic bid to the 1985 NCAA tournament. As the No. 11 seed in the East region, the Shockers lost in the opening round to Georgia, 67–59.

Senior power forward Xavier McDaniel capped one of the greatest careers in program history. McDaniel established single-season school records for points and rebounds, and became the first player to lead the nation in scoring and rebounding in the same season. He was named MVC Player of the Year and a Consensus First-team All-American. McDaniel was taken by the Seattle SuperSonics with the 4th pick in the 1985 NBA draft.

Roster

Schedule and results

|-
!colspan=12 style=""| Regular season

|-
!colspan=12 style=""| MVC Tournament

|-
!colspan=9 style="" | NCAA tournament

Awards and honors
Xavier McDaniel – Consensus First-Team All-American, MVC Player of the Year, First player to lead the nation in scoring (27.2) and rebounding (14.8) in the same season, single-season school records for scoring and rebounding, school record for career rebounds

NBA Draft

References

Wichita State Shockers men's basketball seasons
Wichita State
Wichita State
Shock
Shock